Mahmud Gawan (1411 – 1481) was a prime minister in the Bahmani Sultanate of Deccan. Khwaja Mahmud Gilani, from the village of Gawan in Persia, was well-versed in Islamic theology, Persian language and Mathematics and was a poet and a prose writer of repute. Later, he became a minister in the court of Muhammad III (1463–1482). A storehouse of wisdom, Mahmud enjoyed the trust and confidence of rulers, locals as well as that of foreign kingdoms, who had great respect for Mahmud.

He was a competent and successful general, a capable administrator and patron of art and poetry.

Origins 
Mahmud Gawan hailed from Gilan in Persia, born into a family of imperial ministers. Gawan eventually left his homeland due to discontentment with its political environment. He toured various regions of Asia, finding success as a merchant and also developing an affinity for learning. He arrived in the Indian subcontinent in the year 1453 (aged 42), at the port of Dabhol, motivated by financial opportunities offered by the rich courts of South Asia. Additionally, South Asia was a lucrative market for goods that he intended to sell. Though he intended to travel to Delhi, he first visited Bidar in order to pay homage to a prominent Sufi Dervish there. He subsequently gained an audience with the Bahmani Sultan Ahmad Shah II. The Bahmani Sultanate had consistently favoured high-born Persianate men of talent, and hence Gawan was well-received and made a noble of the Bahmani court, beginning his political career in the Deccan.

Career
He was very capable and efficient. He was a gifted administrator and a skilled general. Greatly impressed with his military genius, Sultan Humayun Shah had taken him in his service. After Humayun's death, he became the guardian of his minor prince Nizam Shah. He had the reigns of Government in his hands. When the young Sultan died in 1463 and his brother Muhammad III aged 9 succeeded him, Mahmud Gawan served as the prime minister. He effectively put an end to the havoc wrought on the pilgrims of Mecca and on merchants by the fleets of Raje Shankarrao Surve and Raje Neelkanthrao Surve of Khelna (Vishalgarh) and Sangameshwar which were part of Shringarpur jagir of Surve Maratha clan respectively. In 1474, a terrible famine known as "famine of Bijapur" devastated the Deccan. Large number of people fled to Gujarat and Malwa. For 2 years the rains failed and when they came in the third year, scarcely any farmers remained in the country to cultivate the lands. He instated a land revenue system and drastically reduced the power of the nobles.

Campaigns against Vijayanagar
Mahmud Gawan served the state most faithfully and enlarged the kingdom to an extent never achieved before. He conquered Kanchi or Kanjeevaram during the course of campaign against Vijayanagar. He fought successful wars against rulers of Konkan, Sangameshwara, Orissa and Vijayanagar. He captured Goa and Dabhol, the best part of Vijayanagar empire.

Education
He built the great university in Bidar which is known as Mahmud Gawan Madrasa. Almost at the centre of Bidar's old Town stand the graceful buildings, which bear testimony to the genius and eclecticism of Mahmud Gawan. A linguist and a mathematician, he, together with carefully chosen scientists, philosophers and religious seers, created a distinguished religious school. His extensive library boasted of 3,000 manuscripts.

This madrasa had a 242 ft length, 222 ft width and 56 ft height three-storied building with a monumental minaret, a mosque, labs, lecture halls and students' cells overlooks an immense courtyard with arches on every side giving it a graceful facade. Many of the blue tiles on the mosque's outer walls have been pilfered. The minaret is elegant with Samarkand-like domes here and there.

Death
There were two factions of nobles: The Deccanis (of local origin) and Afaqis. (of Foreign origin). Mahmud was an Afaqi, so he faced many challenges. Unfortunately, plots were hatched to topple him by the Deccanis, the nobles forged a treasonous document purportedly from him. In a drunken state, the Sultan ordered him executed in April 1481. "With him departed all the cohesion and power of the Bahmani Sultan."

Later the Sultan regretted his hasty decision and buried his Prime Minister with honors. The treasonable documents presented by the critics of Mahmud Gawan were the letters written to the Gajapati king Purushottamadeva of Orissa, which were claimed to have been written by Mahmud. Though Mahmud asserted that the letter was forged, his statement was not given value as the Sultan Muhammad Shah III was himself wary of his growing power and influence. Thus, despite his old age, he was executed. One year after the death of Mahmud, Sultan also died at the age of 29. It was said that Mahmud haunted the Sultan during the last days of his life as he used to scream on his death bed that Mahmud was slaying him.

Legacy
A Russian traveler, Athanasius Nikitin, who visited Bidar, has recorded that Mahmud Gawan's mansion was guarded by a hundred armed men and ten torchbearers.

References

Further reading
 
Greater Bombay District Gazetteer (Muhammedan Period)

Bidar
People from Gilan Province
Iranian emigrants to India
15th-century Iranian people
1411 births
1481 deaths